The Dornier Libelle (en:"Dragonfly I"), also designated Do A, was a German open-cockpit, all-metal, parasol wing, monoplane flying boat aircraft, with partly fabric-covered wings. A landplane version, built without sponsons and fitted with a fixed tailwheel undercarriage was produced as the Dornier Spatz.

Variants
Do A
Two prototypes of the Libelle
Libelle I
The standard production model, five built, fitted with Siemens-Halske Sh 4 engines and two built with  Siemens-Halske Sh 5 engines.
Libelle II
The improved Libelle II was powered by Siemens-Halske Sh 5 or  Siemens-Halske Sh 11 engines. Other engines fitted to Libelle II aircraft include the Bristol Lucifer and the ADC Cirrus. Three built.

Accidents
A Dornier Libelle crashed into the sea off Milford beach in Auckland, New Zealand on 12 December 1929, killing both crewmen.

Survivor

A Libelle II VQ-FAB, manufacturers number 117 built in 1925, which operated in Fiji, is displayed in the Deutsches Museum in the centre of Munich.

Specifications (Libelle I)

References

External links

Dornier “Libelle" at http://www.jadu.de/luftfahrt
"Libelle" at www.histaviation.com

1920s German civil utility aircraft
Flying boats
Libelle
Single-engined tractor aircraft
Parasol-wing aircraft
Aircraft first flown in 1921